The Finest Hours is a 1964 British documentary film about Winston Churchill, directed by Peter Baylis. It was nominated for an Academy Award for Best Documentary Feature.

Cast
 George Baker as Lord Randolph (voice)
 Faith Brook as Lady Randolph (voice)
 David Healy as Newsreel Commentator
 Orson Welles as Narrator (voice)
 George Westbury as Churchill as a boy (voice)
 Patrick Wymark as Churchill (voice)

See also
 Orson Welles filmography

References

External links

1964 films
British documentary films
British black-and-white films
Documentary films about British politicians
Films about Winston Churchill
1964 documentary films
Columbia Pictures films
1960s English-language films
1960s British films